In mathematics, a sesquipower or Zimin word is a string over an alphabet with identical prefix and suffix. Sesquipowers are unavoidable patterns, in the sense that all sufficiently long strings contain one.

Formal definition
Formally, let A be an alphabet and A∗ be the free monoid of finite strings over A.  Every non-empty word w in A+ is a sesquipower of order 1.  If u is a sesquipower of order n then any word w = uvu is a sesquipower of order n + 1.  The degree of a non-empty word w is the largest integer d such that w is a sesquipower of order d.

Bi-ideal sequence
A bi-ideal sequence is a sequence of words fi where f1 is in A+ and

for some gi in A∗ and i ≥ 1.  The degree of a word w is thus the length of the longest bi-ideal sequence ending in w.

Unavoidable patterns
For a finite alphabet A on k letters, there is an integer M depending on k and n, such that any word of length M has a factor which is a sesquipower of order at least n.  We express this by saying that the sesquipowers are unavoidable patterns.

Sesquipowers in infinite sequences
Given an infinite bi-ideal sequence, we note that each fi is a prefix of fi+1 and so the fi converge to an infinite sequence

We define an infinite word to be a sesquipower if it is the limit of an infinite bi-ideal sequence.  An infinite word is a sesquipower if and only if it is a recurrent word, that is, every factor occurs infinitely often.

Fix a finite alphabet A and assume a total order on the letters.  For given integers p and n, every sufficiently long word in A∗ has either a factor which is a p-power or a factor which is an n-sesquipower; in the latter case the factor has an n-factorisation into Lyndon words.

See also
 ABACABA pattern

References

 
 
 

Semigroup theory
Formal languages
Combinatorics on words